The British Amateur Television Club (BATC) is the world's largest television technology club; it has members in the UK and all around the world and is a non-profit making club run by an elected committee of volunteers for the benefit of its members. Membership is open to all who are interested in television, amateur or professional, indeed the club has many members who work for major broadcasting companies.

CQ-TV 
The club's magazine, CQ-TV, is published four times a year and is sent free of charge to BATC members. It is A4 size and has up to 50 pages and it is now in its 7th decade of publication. Available in full colour in paper or cyber form, as a PDF. Articles cover the full range of television interests from HD to Slowscan and Studios to Transmitting. Educational and construction projects are a feature of most issues and a full archive of past issues of CQ-TV is available on the BATC Website.

The BATC in today’s world 
The objectives of the BATC are to encourage and co-ordinate the activities of amateurs involved in all aspects of television. The BATC liaises with the RSGB and other international ATV organisations and is represented at international policy making conferences. The club organises meetings devoted to ATV as well as attending numerous radio meetings around the UK. The BATC fully embraces the Internet, with a web site, Wiki, Forum and an RSS news feed. The club runs various ATV contests throughout the year for fixed and portable stations and, there is an International ATV contest, organised each year by a different member country of the IARU.

The History of the BATC 
The BATC was founded in 1949. The first committee was formed and the publication of CQ-TV started, the world’s first magazine for amateur television transmission. In the early days of the club, members constructed their own cameras, televisions and transmitters. As early as 1954 members transmitted colour signals over a 13-mile path, establishing what is believed to be a record. The BATC were (and still are) instrumental in the development of the repeater network in the UK and the rest of the world. One of the major projects was the development of a repeater control system using a purpose designed microprocessor. The BATC is affiliated to the Radio Society of Great Britain and has frequent contact with other ATV organisations.

The Future of the BATC 
The Club is at the forefront of the new digital technologies with recent projects for digital transmission and reception and the professional SDI standards. Work is underway on using the new H264 digital encoder. This encoder has a number of modes and offers reduced bandwidth signals for the crowded amateur bands. A new BATC forum service has just been introduced and is live now on Forum Link. It is thought that this will become the premier forum for news, help and exchange of TV information. From July 2008 the BATC has started a new video streaming service for the amateur television and radio hobbies.

Television transmission 
To send a television picture in colour across a radio link requires at least a camera, a transmitter, a receiver, a suitable antenna (aerial) and a monitor (TV). The camera provides the picture and the transmitter sends the picture. The transmitter must produce adequate power at microwave frequencies. The receiver must be sensitive at the frequency in use and decode the vision and sound signals. Things that can be added to these basic “blocks” are: multiple cameras, vision captions and effects. The expansion of a television system is almost boundless, a fully equipped ATV studio (and some amateurs do have these) can come later. In the UK all bands from 70 cm upwards are available for ATV. In the 23 cm band and above the standard mode of transmission for ATV is frequency modulation of the vision carrier with a 6 MHz FM audio sub-carrier. The UK ATV calling and talkback frequency is 144.75 MHz FM. Listen or put out a “CQ ATV” call to make initial contact. A licence issued by your national authority is required to operate a television transmitting station, licence conditions will vary in different counties — in the UK this is administered by OFCOM.

Membership 
This is open to all who are interested in television, amateur or professional, anywhere in the world. An amateur radio call sign is not required for membership, indeed many members are interested in studio and video techniques. The BATC has just introduced an additional cyber membership category to allow instant delivery, low cost membership.

References

External links 
  ; BATC Forum ; BATC video streaming service
 Radio Society of Great Britain
 AGAF e.V. German Amateur Television Group
 The Irish Amateur Television Club
 ARRL, ATV in the USA
 Slowscan TV site
 The Narrow Band Television Association

Amateur radio organizations
Amateur radio in the United Kingdom
Clubs and societies in the United Kingdom
Radio organisations in the United Kingdom
Television organisations in the United Kingdom
Organizations established in 1949
1949 establishments in the United Kingdom